The Rukan Islands (Kepulauan Rukan in Indonesian language), also known as the Three Brothers, is a group of three small islands at the south entrance of Durian Strait, in the Riau Islands Province of Indonesia, off the north coast of Sumatra near Singapore.  The group extends about 7.2 km north to south, and is surrounded by many dangerous wrecks.

The highest point is about 43 m above sea level. Reefs extend some distance south of the island. There is a lighthouse on the island, established 1911.<ref name="lighSB">Rukan Selatan Light. Lighthouse Digest website, Accessed on 2012-07-03.</ref>
It is about 1 km long east to west, and about 200 m wide. Its highest point is about 47 m above sea level.
Its highest point is about 24 m above sea level. A tail of reefs extends about 1.5 km from the island towards Middle Brother. There is a lighthouse on the island.

References

Landforms of the Riau Islands
Islands of Sumatra